Ola Williams Kamara (born 15 October 1989) is a Norwegian professional footballer. He plays as a striker, and has also played for Stabæk, Hønefoss, Strømsgodset, Molde, Austria Wien, TSV 1860 Munich, Columbus Crew SC, LA Galaxy, and Shenzhen. He has represented Norway at the youth and senior international levels.

Early life
His father moved from Sierra Leone to Norway as a refugee. Kamara was born and raised in Oslo. When Kamara was one year old, his parents sought help in raising him, and Kamara spent every second weekend, holidays and birthdays with a foster care family. He played for Frigg during his youth, and made his debut for the first-team in the Second Division at the age of 15.

Club career

Stabaek 
Kamara moved to Stabæk at the age of 16, and soon became an integral part team of Stabæk's youth team. He scored the match-winning goal in the final against Viking when Stabæk won the Norwegian Youth Cup in 2008.

Kamara made his debut for Stabæk in Tippeligaen at the age of 16, when he replaced Somen Tchoyi as a substitute in the 2–2 draw against Lillestrøm on 1 October 2006. The next season, he joined the First Division side Hønefoss on a short-term loan, as a replacement for the injured Lars Lafton and Kenneth Di Vita Jensen. Kamara played three matches for Stabæk in 2008, enough to earn him a winners-medal, when the team won Tippeligaen. Kamara's contract expired after the 2008 season, and he wanted to find a new club, even though Stabæk wanted to renew his contract, because he found it too hard to compete with Daniel Nannskog and Veigar Páll Gunnarsson for playing time. After unsuccessful trials with Reggina and Sandefjord, Kamara had gotten an offer from the 2. divisjon side Bærum but on the last day of the transfer window ahead of the 2009 season, he signed a two-year contract with the Tippeligaen side Strømsgodset.

Strømsgodset 
Kamara was mostly back-up for Marcus Pedersen in his first season with Strømsgodset. After Pedersen moved to Netherlands in August 2010, Kamara started to play regularly alongside Jo Inge Berget. Kamara scored seven goal in 25 matches in the 2010 season, and became joint top goalscorer for Strømsgodset alongside Pedersen. Kamara also scored goals in the semifinal and the final when Strømsgodset won the 2010 Norwegian Football Cup. Kamara signed a new two-year contract with Strømsgodset in December 2010, lasting till the end of the 2012 season.

Kamara continued to score goals in the beginning of the 2011 season, and when he scored against Odd Grenland on 10 April 2011 he had scored in six home-matches in a row. He became Strømsgodset's top goalscorer in the 2011 season, with 10 goals. Strømsgodset signed Péter Kovács and Adama Diomande ahead of the 2012 season, and Kamara was expected to play less than he had done the last two seasons, but was however playing regularly on the left wing during the season and was a great contributor to the team. After only scoring one goal in the first half of the season, Kamara scored three goals on Lerkendal Stadion in the 3–3 draw against Rosenborg on 24 June 2012. Kamara scored another hat-trick one week later, when Hønefoss was beaten 5–0. In the 5–0 victory against Fredrikstad on 27 July 2012, Kamara scored one and assisted three other goals. Kamara also scored the match-winning goal against Rosenborg on 5 November 2012, which eliminated Rosenborg title-chances. At the end of the season, Strømsgodset finished second behind Molde, and won their first league-medals since 1997.

Kamara's contract with Strømsgodset expired after the 2012 season.

1860 Munich 
On 20 January 2013, Kamara signed for SV Ried, but was immediately loaned out to TSV 1860 Munich on a six-month contract until the end of the season 2012–13 season with an option to extend the deal to two years. After the season, he went on loan to Strømsgodset.

Return to Strømsgodset 
The loan spell at his old club Strømsgodset was very successful. He scored 12 goals in 14 matches, including a hat-trick in his first match, and thus played a vital role in the team that went on to win the league.

Austria Wien 
After a failed trial at West Ham United
Kamara signed for Austria Wien in January 2014 but scored only two goals in 23 matches.

Molde FK 
On 28 January 2015, Molde FK announced that they had signed Kamara on loan for the 2015 season, with an option to buy the striker.

On 4 August 2015, he scored a goal in 3-3 draw with Dinamo Zagreb in the second match of Third Qualifying Round UEFA Champions League.

Columbus Crew SC 
On 4 February 2016, Kamara signed with Columbus Crew prior to the start of the MLS season. Terms of the transfer were not disclosed. His 2016 base salary was $425,000.

Kamara made his club debut 9 April 2016 in a 2–0 loss to Montreal Impact, replacing Kei Kamara in the 70th minute. He started his time with Crew SC as the backup to Kei Kamara, but jumped into the starting role when Kei was traded to the New England Revolution. His first goal for the Crew was against Real Salt Lake on 28 May, adding two more to complete the hat trick. Kamara ended his first season outside Europe with 16 goals and two assists in 25 MLS appearances.

LA Galaxy 
After two successful seasons with Columbus, in January 2018 Kamara was traded to LA Galaxy in exchange for Gyasi Zardes and $400,000 in targeted allocation money. LA sent an additional $100,000 in TAM to the Crew after Kamara passed the 12-goal mark last season. After the arrival of Zlatan Ibrahimovic to the Galaxy, Kamara wanted to pursue other options elsewhere. LA Galaxy General Manager Dennis te Kloese in a club statement. “Ola wanted to pursue opportunities elsewhere, and we worked to complete a move that will give us options to strengthen our roster moving forward. We thank Ola for what he has contributed to this club and wish him the best in his future.”

Shenzhen paid the Galaxy a $3.5 million transfer fee for Kamara, who signed a three-year contract with the club that would pay him $3 million net per year.

Shenzhen 
On 27 February 2019, Kamara transferred to Chinese Super League newcomer Shenzhen.

D.C. United 
After an unsuccessful spell in China where he only made six appearances for Shenzhen, Kamara returned to Major League Soccer, joining D.C. United for a transfer fee of $2.5 million. D.C. United also sent $200,000 of General Allocation Money to Colorado Rapids in exchange for the No.1 slot in the 2019 Allocation Ranking, allowing them to select Kamara. He appeared the first time for DC United after being subbed on for Wayne Rooney in the 74th minute of the Vancouver Whitecaps game on 17 August 2019 In his first start for DC, Kamara scored his first DC goal in the 55th minute against the New York Red Bulls on 21 August 2019. In only his third start for DC United, he scored two goals against the Montreal Impact on 31 August 2019. The game ended as a 3–0 DC win. During the 2019 season, Kamara suffered a hamstring injury. He then returned from injury coming on in the 69th minute in a crucial game against FC Cincinnati on 6 October 2019. The crucial game ended 0–0, crushing United's hopes of hosting a round one MLS playoff game. DC had to travel to Toronto for the first round of the 2019 MLS Cup Playoffs and were defeated 5-1 after giving up 4 goals in AET to end their season.

Kamara's 2020 season was extremely disappointing, although the COVID-19 Pandemic did cause a break in the MLS season and subsequent rearrangement of the schedule. He played in 22 of D.C.'s 23 regular season matches and started 17 but only managed to net four goals and did not provide a single assist. Kamara did score on the final day of season in the 33rd minute to give D.C. a 2–1 lead over Montreal Impact but two late goals by the Impact to turn the match around denied D.C. a second straight playoff appearance.

The 2021 Season did not start on a high note for Kamara. Due to a preseason injury setback he missed D.C.’s first three matches and was limited to 90 minutes total in his next four. He caught fire, however, during the summer months as he scored 13 goals in 14 matches in July, August, and September. He also lead the league in G/90 with 0.94. On the final day of the season Kamara scored a brace in a 3–1 win against Toronto FC which pushed him into a tie at the top of the 2021 MLS Golden Boot standings. Ultimately, though, he lost out to Valentin Castellanos due to the assist tiebreaker. That hurt was coupled by the fact that even though D.C. won their final match, other results did not go in their favor and they missed out on the 2021 MLS Cup Playoffs by one point.

Kamara started his 2022 season with a goal in D.C.'s 3–0 win against new-comers Charlotte FC on February 26.

International career 
Kamara was eligible to represent either Norway or Sierra Leone national teams at international levels, as his mother is Norwegian and his father Sierra Leonean. Kamara was selected for regional teams in Oslo at the age of 15, and later represented Norway at under-16 and under-17 level. He has also represented the Norway under-23 national football team. Kamara made his debut for the Norwegian national team when he replaced Daniel Braaten in the 61st minute of the World Cup qualifier against Slovenia on 11 October 2013.  In the match against Iceland four days later, Kamara made his starting-debut on his 24th birthday and played a total of 55 minutes.

Career statistics

Club

International

Scores and results list Norway's goal tally first, score column indicates score after each Kamara goal.

Personal life
In March 2018, Kamara earned a U.S. green card, which qualifies him as a domestic player for MLS roster purposes.

Honours

Club
Strømsgodset
Tippeligaen: 2013
Norwegian Cup: 2010

References

External links 

 
Norway profile at Fotball.No

1989 births
Living people
Footballers from Oslo
Norwegian people of Sierra Leonean descent
Norwegian footballers
Norway international footballers
Frigg Oslo FK players
Stabæk Fotball players
Hønefoss BK players
Strømsgodset Toppfotball players
SV Ried players
TSV 1860 Munich players
Molde FK players
Columbus Crew players
LA Galaxy players
Shenzhen F.C. players
D.C. United players
Eliteserien players
Norwegian First Division players
2. Bundesliga players
Austrian Football Bundesliga players
Major League Soccer players
Chinese Super League players
Norwegian expatriate footballers
Expatriate footballers in Germany
Norwegian expatriate sportspeople in Germany
Expatriate footballers in Austria
Norwegian expatriate sportspeople in Austria
Expatriate soccer players in the United States
Norwegian expatriate sportspeople in the United States
Expatriate footballers in China
Association football forwards